The following is a timeline of the history of the city of Omsk, Russia.

Prior to 20th century

 1716 - Omsk fortress established.
 1792 - The Lutheran Church of the Holy Catherine built.
 1804 - Town chartered.
 1808 - Siberian Cossack Army headquartered in Omsk.
 1813 - Cossack school founded.
 1823 - Fire.
 1827 - Agricultural research institute established.
 1839 - Capital of western Siberia relocated to Omsk from Tobolsk.
 1843 - St. Nicholas Cossack Cathedral built.
 1876 -  established.
 1877 - Russian Geographical Society's west Siberian branch established.
 1878 -  founded.
 1881 - Population: 31,000.
 1887 - Population: 33,847.
 1895 - Trans-Siberian Railway begins operating.
 1897 - Population: 37,470.
 1898 - Assumption Cathedral consecrated.
 1900 - Population: 53,050.

20th century

 1913 - Population: 135,800.
 1918 - November: Provisional All-Russian Government headquartered in Omsk.
 1919
 14 November: Red Army takes city.
 Union of Chinese Workers formed.
 1927 - Agricultural Institute's Botanical Garden established.
 1929 - Omsk Tsentralny Airport begins operating.
 1933 -  established.
 1934 - City becomes part of the Omsk Oblast.
 1935 - Assumption Cathedral demolished; Pioneer's Square laid out.
 1937 -  founded.
 1939 - Population: 280,716.
 1946 - Football Club Irtysh Omsk formed.
 1950 - Spartak Omsk ice hockey team formed.
 1955 - Oil refinery begins operating in vicinity.
 1965 - Population: 721,000.
 1966 - Red Star Stadium (Omsk) opens.
 1973 -  founded.
 1974 - Omsk State University established.
 1983 - Literature museum founded.
 1985 - Population: 1,108,000.
 1986 - Blinov Sports and Concerts Complex opens.
 1989 - Population: 1,148,418.
 1990 - Siberian International Marathon begins.
 1991
  founded.
 Leonid Polezhayev becomes governor of Omsk Oblast.
  becomes mayor.
 1992 - Omsk Metro construction begins.
 1993 - Omsk State Pedagogical University active.
 1994 -  becomes mayor.
 2000 - City becomes part of the Siberian Federal District.

21st century

 2001 -  becomes mayor.
 2005 -  becomes mayor.
 2007
 Arena Omsk opens.
 Assumption Cathedral reconstructed.
 2010 - Population: 1,153,971.
 2012 -  becomes mayor.

See also
 Omsk history
 
 Timelines of other cities in the Siberian Federal District of Russia: Novosibirsk

References

This article incorporates information from the Russian Wikipedia and German Wikipedia.

Bibliography

External links

 

omsk
omsk
Years in Russia